SG Kleinwort Hambros is a private bank owned by Société Générale that offers financial services from offices throughout the United Kingdom, Channel Islands and Gibraltar.

History
In June 2016, Société Générale acquired Kleinwort Benson from Oddo et Cie. It merged Kleinwort Benson with its existing private banking subsidiary SG Hambros in November 2016 to form Kleinwort Hambros. Mouhammed Choukeir was appointed CEO in April 2020.

References

Economy of the City of London
Investment banks
Banks established in 2016
Financial services companies established in 2016
Banks of the United Kingdom